Adu Celso-Santos (born Eduardo Celso Santos, 7 August 1945 - 6 February 2005) was a Brazilian professional motorcycle road racer. He was the first Brazilian  to compete in Grand Prix motorcycle racing.

Celso-Santos was popular on the Grand Prix circuit during first half of the 1970s. He raced from 1972 to the 1975 season before returning to Brazil.

In the 1973 Grand Prix season, he gained his only victory in a race counting for world championship points when he won the 350cc class at the Spanish Grand Prix held at the Jarama Circuit.

Motorcycle Grand Prix results
Points system from 1969 onwards:

(key) (Races in bold indicate pole position; races in italics indicate fastest lap)

References

1945 births
2005 deaths
350cc World Championship riders
500cc World Championship riders
Brazilian motorcycle racers
Place of birth missing